The wahi grosbeak or Oahu grosbeak (Chloridops wahi) is a prehistoric species of Hawaiian honeycreeper. The wahi grosbeak was endemic to dry forests on the Hawaiian islands of Kauai, Oahu, and Maui. Based on the thickness of its bill it fed on seeds easier to crack than those of the naio (Myoporum sandwicense), on which the Kona grosbeak fed. The species was already extinct when Europeans landed on the island. Being only known from fossils, its behavior and the exact reasons for its extinction are essentially unknown. Its fossils have been found throughout the islands, but were present in higher concentrations in caves.

References

Chloridops
Endemic fauna of Hawaii
Extinct birds of Hawaii
Hawaiian honeycreepers
Biota of Kauai
Biota of Maui
Biota of Oahu
Late Quaternary prehistoric birds
Quaternary birds of Oceania
Fossil taxa described in 1991 
Holocene extinctions